Finlayson Oy is a Finnish textile manufacturer. The company was founded in 1820 when James Finlayson, a Scottish engineer, established a cotton mill in Tampere. The company manufactures various interior textiles and bedding under the brand names Finlayson and Familon. The company has stores and retailers in Finland, Russia, and the Baltic countries, as well as an online store.

The Plevna, a Finlayson building, was the first building in the Nordic countries and in the Russian Empire (of which Finland was part at the time) to be lit by electric lighting; the light bulbs of Thomas Edison were first used there on 15 March 1882.

See also
 Finlayson (district)
 Näsilinna
 Plevna, Tampere
 Tampella
 Wilhelm von Nottbeck Park

References

External links 
 

Manufacturing companies established in 1820
Finnish brands
Textile companies of Finland